is a very small near-Earth asteroid of the Apollo group, first observed by the Asteroid Terrestrial-impact Last Alert System at Haleakala Observatory on 23 September 2019. It was briefly listed on the Risk List of the European Space Agency. With a 18-day observation arc, the nominal orbit passes  from Earth on 27 September 2084. It was removed from the Sentry Risk Table on 12 October 2019.

According to astronomers, "Its small size of about  would result in limited consequences even in case of impact."

Trajectory

See also 
 Chelyabinsk meteor

References

External links 
 
 
 

Discoveries by ATLAS
Minor planet object articles (unnumbered)
Near-Earth objects in 2019
Near-Earth objects removed from the Sentry Risk Table
20190923